Jack Perry may refer to:
Jack Perry (1916–2006), Australian clown in duo Zig and Zag
Jack Perry (entrepreneur) (born 1963), American entrepreneur
Jackie Perry (1924–2018), English rugby league footballer
Jungle Boy (wrestler) (born 1997), American professional wrestler

See also
Jack Parry (1924–2010), Welsh footballer
John Perry (disambiguation)